The People’s Anti-Fascist Front (PAFF) is a militant organisation active in the insurgency in Jammu and Kashmir, an ongoing armed conflict between Kashmiri separatists and Indian forces. India claims it is an offshoot of Lashkar-e-Taiba. According to Tracking Terrorism, it is believed the group was started in 2020 by Jaish-e-Mohammad or Lashkar-e-Taiba.

Attacks & Activities

Attacks
The PAFF has claimed responsibility for attacks in Jammu and Kashmir against Indian forces:
 3 June 2021: PAFF militants claimed responsibility for the murder of BJP leader Rakesh Pandita.
 11 August 2021: PAFF claimed responsibility for an attack against Indian forces in Rajouri district, on Eid ul-Adha in which four Indian soldiers were killed.
 11 October 2021: PAFF claimed responsibility for an attack in Mendhar in the forests of Poonch district which killed 9 Indian soldiers.
 3 October 2022: J&K Director General of Prisons Hemant Lohia was killed in his house while Home Minister Amit Shah was visiting; PAFF claimed responsibility.

Activities 
 On 11 August 2021 - PAFF released a video in which PAFF claimed responsibility for an attack against Indian forces in Darhal, Rajouri district, on Eid ul-Adha in which five Indian soldiers were killed & said the G-20 summit was their next target. 
 On 29 October 2021 - The PAFF releases video for solidarity with arrested Kashmiri Students by Indian forces for celebrating Pakistan's victory against India in the 2021 ICC Men's T20 World Cup tournament. The video was released with a photo of a Milkor MGL which was captured from a Killed in action Indian soldier. It looked like PAFF has captured an MGL from the Indian army in ongoing Poonch clashes, evident from the blood stains on the MGL and typical Indian army marking in paint.
 On 5 November 2021 - PAFF releases a video paying tribute to Hamdullah Mukhlis & condemns the Afghan Taliban leader Hamdullah Mukhlis, dead in a suicide attack on a hospital by ISKP. The PAFF openly criticized ISIS and the PAFF clamed "ISIS is the Puppet of the enemies of Islam; they feel pleasure in killing innocent peoples which is very shameful".
 On 20 July 2022 - PAFF released a long-awaited special message video.
 On 14 August 2022 - PAFF releases threat video to India. In the video, the PAFF says "we are very, very determined to not allow India to conduct any G-20 meetings in Kashmir".
 On 9 October 2022 - PAFF released its training video on social media.
 On 12 February 2023 - PAFF issued a letter in which it has threatened to attack the newly discovered Lithium mines in the Jammu and Kashmir, says ‘will attack companies stealing our resources’ in  Jammu and Kashmir.

References 

Rebel groups in India
Jihadist groups in Jammu and Kashmir
Kashmir separatist movement
2020 establishments in Pakistan
Lashkar-e-Taiba